The Forsyth Bridge across the Yellowstone River in Forsyth, Montana is a Pennsylvania truss bridge which was built in 1905.  It has also been known as Yellowstone River Bridge.  It was listed on the National Register of Historic Places in 1990.

The need for the bridge was deeply felt locally and was a major factor in the area's initiative to create the county, splitting the area off of Custer County so that this bridge would be built.

When listed, only one of the bridge's three spans survived.

References

National Register of Historic Places in Rosebud County, Montana
Bridges completed in 1905
Pennsylvania truss bridges in the United States
Road bridges on the National Register of Historic Places in Montana
1905 establishments in Montana
Bridges over the Yellowstone River
Transportation in Rosebud County, Montana